The Gazuit-Valladeau GV-103 Gazelle was a French-built light two- to four-seat training, aerobatic and touring aircraft of the late 1960s.

Design and development
The first GV-103L, as it was originally called, was a two- or three-seat light touring aircraft first flown in 1969. Later referred to as the GV-103 and powered by an 86 kW (115 hp) Lycoming O-235 flat-four engine, it led to several production variants with two, three and four seats using engines of increasing power within the same airframe. It had a side-by-side seating layout and a fixed tricycle undercarriage with a longer nosewheel which gave the aircraft a pronounced tail-down attitude on the ground.  Its construction was primarily metal but included some glass fibre structures and plastic bonding, novel at the time.

First flown on 1 May 1969, the GV-103 first appeared in public at the Paris Air Show in June 1969. The first two-seat production prototype GV-1020 Gazelle was on display at the Paris 1971 Show.  It was intended to meet a club market for basic and aerobatic training.

The second Gazelle to fly was the prototype of the four-seat GV-1031 tourer, powered by a 112 kW (150 hp) Lycoming O-320 flat-four engine.  An intermediate, three-seat variant with a Rolls-Royce built 97 kW (130 hp) Continental O-240 engine was planned but may not have been built. A four-five seat variant with a 134 kW (180 hhp) engine and retractable undercarriage was also planned, and feasibility studies of  a twin-engine version made, but neither reached the construction stage.

Operational history

By November 1972 seven Gazelle prototypes were flying and the GV-1301 received its French certification in April that year, with the CV-1020 expected to follow in January 1973. The GV-1020 had only a short operational career and was no longer on the French civil aircraft register by January 1983, though two GV-1031s, one dismantled, remained registered in mid-2010. In 1970 plans for the Canadian company Mondair Aviation to build the Gazelle range under licence as the Mondair 115/130/150 were announced. One GV-1031, without engine, reached Canada, but no North American production followed.

Variants
GV-103L
Later GV-103. First prototype, two-three seat, 85.7 kW (115 hp) Lycoming O-235 powered.     
GV-1031
Second prototype and production four-seat tourer, 112 kW (150 hp) Lycoming O-320 powered. At least two built, one going to Canada.
GV-1020
Production two-seat aerobatic and basic trainer, 85.7 kW (115 hp) Lycoming O-235 powered.
GV-1032
Three seat, Rolls-Royce built 97 kW (130 hp) Continental O-240. May not have been completed.

Specifications

Notes

References

External links

Avia France

1960s French civil utility aircraft
Low-wing aircraft
Single-engined tractor aircraft
Aircraft first flown in 1969